Dufferin Island is an island on the Central Coast of British Columbia, Canada. It is located on the south side of Seaforth Channel just northwest of Bella Bella. Dufferin Island was named in 1876 by Captain Chatfield and the officers of HMS Amethyst after Frederick Hamilton-Temple-Blackwood.

Dufferin Island is part of a volcanic area called the Milbanke Sound Group which includes several monogenetic cinder cones. Holocene basaltic lava flows from Dufferin Island overlie adjacent beach deposits.

References

Islands of British Columbia
Central Coast of British Columbia